"We're All in the Same Gang" is a 1990 Grammy nominated single by the West Coast Rap All-Stars, a collaboration of West Coast hip-hop artists who assembled for this song, which promoted an anti-violence message.

Production
Produced by Dr. Dre, the song featured rhymed lyrics from the following, in order of appearance:
 King Tee
 Body & Soul (including Dee Barnes)
 Def Jef
 Michel'le
 Tone-Loc
 Above the Law
 Ice-T
 Dr. Dre and MC Ren of N.W.A
 J.J. Fad
 Young MC
 Digital Underground (Humpty Hump and Shock G)
 Oaktown's 3.5.7
 MC Hammer
 Eazy-E

On the B-side was the Radio Special version of the single (trimmed down to 4 minutes with the exclusion of Def Jef, Above the Law, JJ Fad, Oaktown's 3.5.7. and MC Hammer), and the song "Tellin' Time (Mike's Rap)", produced by Shock G and featuring vocals by Dr. Dre and Michael Concepcion.

The voice of the news reader in the song's intro was done by then-future World Championship Wrestling announcer Lee Marshall.

N.W.A., Michel'le, Above the Law and J.J. Fad all recorded for Eazy-E and Jerry Heller's Ruthless Records.

In 1991, the song was nominated at the 33rd Annual Grammy Awards for Best Rap Performance by a Duo or Group.

Chart performance

See also

References

External links
  at Discogs.com

West Coast hip hop
1990 singles
All-star recordings
Charity singles
Warner Records singles
Dr. Dre songs
Song recordings produced by Dr. Dre
1990 songs
Posse cuts